Francis James (April 4, 1799 – January 4, 1886) was an American politician from Pennsylvania who was an Anti-Masonic and Whig member of the U.S. House of Representatives for Pennsylvania's 4th congressional district from 1839 to 1843.

Biography
Francis James was born in Thornbury Township, Chester County, Pennsylvania. He attended the local public schools and Gauses' Academy. He began reading law in 1823 and gained admittance to the bar of Chester County, Pennsylvania in May 1825. He commenced practice in West Chester, Pennsylvania. He married Sarah H. James of Westtown Township, Chester County, Pennsylvania, on September 7, 1826, and had one daughter, Anna M. James. He was elected to the Pennsylvania State Senate for the 4th district, serving from 1835 to 1836, and again for the 3rd district, serving from 1837 to 1838.

In October 1838, James was elected as an Anti-Mason to the 26th U.S. Congress and in 1840 reelected as a Whig to the 27th Congress. He served from March 4, 1839 to March 3, 1843. During his second term, Representative James chaired the House Committee on Revisal and Unfinished Business. According to J. Smith Futhey and Gilbert Cope (1881), while in Congress James "took a strong anti-slavery position and by speech and vote resisted the encroachments of the slave power."

After departing from Congress, he resumed his legal practice in West Chester and served as the borough's chief burgess in 1850. He died in West Chester on January 4, 1886, and is interred at Oaklands Cemetery.

References

External links

1799 births
1886 deaths
19th-century American lawyers
19th-century American politicians
Anti-Masonic Party members of the United States House of Representatives from Pennsylvania
Burials at Oaklands Cemetery
Pennsylvania lawyers
Pennsylvania state senators
People from Chester County, Pennsylvania
Whig Party members of the United States House of Representatives from Pennsylvania